Acronychia laevis, commonly known as hard aspen, glossy acronychia or northern white lilly pilly, is a species of shrub or small tree in the citrus family, and is endemic to eastern Australia. It has simple, elliptical to egg-shaped leaves, groups of creamy white flowers and fleshy, mitre-shaped to spherical fruit.

Description
The trunk has fairly smooth, fawn bark with some vertical lines and wrinkles. The leaves are shiny green on both sides with a blunt or rounded tip and have oil dots that may be seen using a lens and a bright light.

Taxonomy
Acronychia laevis was first described in 1775 by German naturalists Johann Reinhold Forster and Georg Forster who published the description in their book Characteres Generum Plantarum. The specific epithet laevis is the Latin adjective "smooth", and refers to the new shoots and leaves.

Distribution and habitat
It is found from the upper Clarence River, New South Wales in New South Wales to Cape York Peninsula in Queensland, on New Caledonia and on Lord Howe Island.

Ecology
The fruit is eaten by the green catbird.

Use in horticulture
Acronychia laevis can be grown in a sunny or part-shaded position in a garden. Its attractive fruit and flowers have horticultural appeal. It can be propagated from seed, although cuttings may also be attempted. The fruit is edible to humans, although described as too pungent to be palatable, and have even been likened to turpentine.

References

laevis
Flora of New South Wales
Flora of Queensland
Flora of Lord Howe Island
Flora of New Caledonia
Plants described in 1775
Taxa named by Georg Forster
Taxa named by Johann Reinhold Forster